Ren Chengyuan (Chinese: 任成远;born 1986-09-20 in Jiangsu) is a female Chinese Olympic cyclist, who competed for Team China at the 2008 Summer Olympics.

Sports career
2001 Xuzhou Spare-time Sports School;
2002 Jiangsu Provincial Mountain Bike Team;
2005 National Team
2011 Specialized Racing
2016 China Jiangsu ZGL MTB Team

Major performances
2004 Mountain Bike XC National Championships - 2nd place;
2005 Mountain Bike XC National Championships - 1st place;
2005 Asian Championships MTB XC - 1st place;
2006 Mountain Bike World Championships U23 XC - 1st place;
2007 Mountain Bike World Cup XC Round 1 - Houffalize, Belgium - 1st;
2007 Mountain Bike World Cup XC Round 2 - Offenburg, Germany - 7th;
2007 Mountain Bike World Cup XC Round 3 - Champery, SUI - 14th 
2007 Mountain Bike World Cup XC Women's Elite Round 4 - Mont Sainte Anne, CAN - 2nd place  
2007 Mountain Bike World Cup XC Women's Elite Round 5 - St Felicien, CAN - 6th place 
2007 Mountain Bike World Cup XC Women's Elite Round 6 (Final Round) - Maribor, SLO - 5th place 
2007 UCI Mountain Bike World Cup XC Women's U23 World Cup overall winner;
2007 UCI Mountain Bike World Cup XC Women's ELITE World Cup overall 3rd place, with 918 points.  Marie-Helen Premont was 2nd place with 1040 points, and Irina Kalentyeva was the overall winner with 1174 points.;
2008 Mountain Bike World Cup XC Round 1 - Houffalize, Belgium - 1st;
2008 Mountain Bike World Cup XC Round 2 - Offenburg, Germany - 3rd 
2008 Olympic Games - MTB XC - 5th place;
2009 Mountain Bike World Cup XC Round 2 - Offenburg, Germany - 1st;
2009 Mountain Bike World Cup XC Round 3 - Houffalize, Belgium - 3rd;
2009 Mountain Bike XC National Championships - 1st place;
2009 National Games - 1st women's cycling mountain cross-country;
2009 Asian Championships - MTB XC - 1st place Held in Malacca, Malaysia
2010 Asian Championships - MTB XC - 1st place. Held in Jecheon City, Korea
2011 Mountain Bike World Cup XC Women's Elite Round 1 - Pietermaritzburg, South Africa - 1st place;
2011 Mountain Bike World Cup XC Women's Elite Round 2 - Yorkshire, Dalby Forest, UK - 5th place 
2014 Asian Championships  - MTB XC Team Relay - 1st place: (4 Team China members: BIEKEN, Nazaerbieke; REN, Chengyuan; GU, Bingcheng; YIN, Siyuan) Held in Lubuklinggau City, Indonesia
2014 Asian Championships - MTB XC Women's Elite - 2nd place.
2015 Mountain Bike World Cup XC Women's Elite Round 1 - Nove Mesto, CZE: 24th place
2015 Asian Championships - MTB XC Women's Elite - 1st place
2016 Asian Championships in Chai Nat, Thailand - MTB XC Women's Elite - 1st place
2016 International Kamptal Klassik Trophy in Langenlois, Austria - MTB XC Women's Elite - 2nd place
2016 Mountain Bike World Cup XC Women's Elite Round 1 - Cairns, AUS: 25th place
2016 Mountain Bike World Cup XC Women's Elite Round 2 - Albstadt, GER: 38th place
2016 Mountain Bike World Cup XC Women's Elite Round 3 - La Bresse, FRA: 26th place

References
 First World Cup win 2007 UCI World Cup Round 1 - Houffalize, Belgium
 Profile  Beijing 2008 Team China
 National Champion for the 3rd time 
 2010 Asian Games 1st place Women's Cross Country
  2011 UCI World Cup 1st Place, Round 1 - Pietermaritzburg, South Africa

Specific

1986 births
Living people
Chinese female cyclists
Cyclists from Jiangsu
Cyclists at the 2010 Asian Games
Asian Games medalists in cycling
Medalists at the 2010 Asian Games
Asian Games gold medalists for China